Axel Said Grijalva Soto (born 26 July 2000) is a Mexican professional footballer who plays as a defender for Liga MX club Monterrey.

Career statistics

Club

Honours
Monterrey
CONCACAF Champions League: 2021

References

External links

Axel Grijalva at Sofa Score
Axel Grijalva at MSN Deportes

2000 births
Living people
Mexican footballers
C.F. Monterrey players
Liga MX players
Footballers from Sinaloa
Association football defenders
Raya2 Expansión players